Vallières is a commune in the Vallières Arrondissement, in the Nord-Est department of Haiti. It has 17,470 inhabitants.

Communal Sections 
The commune consists of three communal sections, namely:
 Trois Palmistes, urban and rural, containing the village of Vallières
 Ecrevisse or Grosse Roche, urban and rural, containing the village of Grosse Roche
 Corosse, rural

References

Populated places in Nord-Est (department)
Communes of Haiti